The Cynetes or Conii were one of the pre-Roman peoples of the Iberian Peninsula, living in today's Algarve and Lower Alentejo regions of southern Portugal, and the southern part of Badajoz and the northwestern portions of Córdoba and Ciudad Real provinces in Spain before the 6th century BCE (in what part of this become the southern part of the Roman province of Lusitania). According to Justin's epitome, the mythical Gargoris and Habis were their founding kings.

Etymology 
The name Cynetes (Latin Conii) probably stems from Proto-Celtic *kwon ('dog') connected with greek kyοn, κύων, dog.

Origins and location

They are often mentioned in the ancient sources under various designations, mostly Greek or Latin derivatives of their two tribal names: ‘Cynetas’/’Cynetum’; ‘Kunetes’, ‘Kunetas’, and ‘Kunesioi' or ‘Cuneus’, followed by ‘Konioi’, ‘Kouneon’ and ‘Kouneous’/‘Kouneoi’. The Conii occupied since the late Bronze Age most of the present-day Lower Alentejo, Algarve, the southern part of Badajoz and the northwestern portions of Córdoba and Ciudad Real provinces, giving the Algarve its pre-Roman name, the Cyneticum.  Prior to the Celtic-Turduli migrations of the 5th-4th Centuries BC the original Conii territories also included upper Alentejo and the Portuguese coastal Estremadura region stretching up to the Munda (Mondego) river valley.

Genetics 
It has been suggested that the haplotypes HLA-A25-B18-DR15 and HLA-A26-B38-DR13, which are unique genetic markers found in Portugal, may be from the Conii (or Oestrimni).

Culture

Their presence in these regions is attested archeologically by the elaborated cremation burial-mounds of their ruling elite, whose rich grave-goods and the inscribed slabs in ‘Tartessian alphabet’ – also referred to as ‘Southwest script’ – that mark the graves, evidence close contacts with North Africa and the eastern Mediterranean since the 9th century BC. Scholars like Schulten, consider the Conii a Ligurian tribe (related to the Ligures of North-western Italy/South-eastern France) and believe that the «Ligurians are the original people of the Iberian Peninsula». The Conii would have left their mark not only in Portugal but also in Spain and European regions where the Ligurians established themselves. They appear to be related to the Aquitanians and the Basques.

Inscriptions in the Tartessian language have been found in the area, in a variety often referred to as Southwest Paleohispanic script. The name Conii, found in Strabo, seems to have been identical with the Cynesii, who were mentioned by Herodotus as the westernmost dwellers of Europe and distinguished by him from the Celts.

Towns

The capital of the Conii was Conistorgis, according to Strabo, who considered the region Celtic. In the local language Conistorgis probably means "City of the Conii". Its precise location has not been determined. Some authors suggest that Pax Julia might have been founded over the ruins of Conistorgis. 
Other Conii towns (Oppida) included Ipses (Alvor), Cilpe (Cerro da Rocha Branca – Silves), Ossonoba (near Faro; Iberian-type mint: Osunba), Balsa (Quinta da Torre de Aires, Santa Luzia – Tavira), Baesuris (Castro Marim; Iberian-type mint: Baesuri) and Myrtilis (Mértola; Iberian-type mint: Mrtlis Saidie).  According to Pomponius Mela the population of these parva oppida did not surpass 6,000 inhabitants.
A powerful urban aristocracy of Phoenician and Turdetanian or Turduli colonists dominated all the trade, fishing, and shipbuilding in these same coastal settlements since the 4th Century BC, until the Carthaginians occupied the Cyneticum and founded the Punic colonies of Portus Hannibalis (near Portimão?) and Portus Magonis (Portimão) at the late 3rd Century BC.

History
The Conii seemed to have played no significant role in the Second Punic War and subsequent conflicts, even though they were constantly under the pressure from the northernly Celtic tribes throughout the 3rd-2nd Centuries BC, which may explain their willingness to place themselves under the protection of foreign powers such as Carthage and later Rome.  Around the 3rd Century BC the Celtici reached the western Algarve, establishing a colony at Laccobriga (Monte Molião, near Lagos) and in 153 BC, during the Lusitanian Wars against Rome, Conistorgis fell to the Lusitani and their Vettones’ allies. The Conii were thence forced to switch their allegiance from the Roman Republic to the Lusitani, being subjected in 141-140 BC to Consul Quintus Fabius Maximus Servilianus’ reprisal campaigns in the Iberian southwest.  In 138-137 BC the Cyneticum was aggregated into Hispania Ulterior province, only to become again a battleground during the Sertorian Wars, when Quintus Sertorius seized Conistorgis and Consul Quintus Caecilius Metellus Pius devastated the region in retaliation, being defeated at the battle of Laccobriga in 78 BC.

Romanization
In 27-13 BC the romanized Conii were incorporated into Lusitania province.

See also
History of Portugal
Prehistoric Iberia
Conistorgis
Cyneticum
Timeline of Portuguese history
Sefes
Sertorian Wars
Southwest Paleohispanic script
"Tartessian" language (Southwestern or "South-Lusitanian" language) 
Pre-Roman peoples of the Iberian Peninsula

Notes

References

Mattoso, José (dir.), História de Portugal. Primeiro Volume: Antes de Portugal, Lisboa, Círculo de Leitores, 1992. (in Portuguese)

Primary
Strabo, Geographika, III, 2, 2.

Further reading 

 Ángel Montenegro et alii, Historia de España 2 - colonizaciones y formación de los pueblos prerromanos (1200-218 a.C), Editorial Gredos, Madrid (1989) 
 Berrocal-Rangel, Luis, Los pueblos célticos del soroeste de la Península Ibérica, Editorial Complutense, Madrid (1992) 
 Philip Matyszak, Sertorius and the struggle for Spain, Pen & Sword Military, Barnsley (2013) 
 Luis Silva, Viriathus and the Lusitanian resistance to Rome 155-139 BC, Pen & Sword Military, Barnsley (2013) 
 Palacios, Fernando Fernández. "CELTIC ‘DOGS’ IN THE IBERIAN PENINSULA." In Celtic from the West 3: Atlantic Europe in the Metal Ages — Questions of Shared Language, edited by Koch John T. and Cunliffe Barry, by Cleary Kerri and Gibson Catriona D., 477-88. OXFORD: Oxbow Books, 2016. Accessed June 29, 2020. www.jstor.org/stable/j.ctvh1dhg7.19.

External links
Detailed map of the Pre-Roman Peoples of Iberia (around 200 BC)

Tribes of Lusitania
History of the Algarve
Ancient peoples of Portugal
History of Alentejo
Pre-Roman peoples of the Iberian Peninsula